Vovkove may refer to the following places in Ukraine:

Vovkove, Donetsk Oblast, village in Pokrovsk Raion
Vovkove, Odessa Oblast, village in Berezivka Raion
Vovkove, Sumy Oblast, village in Romny Raion
Vovkove, Zakarpattia Oblast, village in Uzhhorod Raion
Vovkove, former name of Tanivka, village in Berezivka Raion, Odessa Oblast